Western Flyer were a short lived Australian blues band formed in the mid-1970s. The group released two studio albums in the late 1970s.

Discography

Studio albums

Compilation albums

Singles

References

Australian pop music groups
Musical groups established in 1975
Musical groups disestablished in 1979